Inglis Gundry (8 May 1905 – 13 April 2000) was an English composer, novelist, musicologist, music pedagogue and writer. He is particularly remembered for his operas and for his numerous books; not only on music, but on a broad array of historical subjects. For five decades he lectured on music appreciation for WEA London and also taught on the music faculties at the University of Cambridge, the University of London, and the University of Surrey.

Life and career
Born in Wimbledon to parents of Cornish descent, Gundry had a passion for Cornish culture and played an instrumental role in preserving Cornish folk songs and carols with the publication of Canow Kernow: Songs and Dances of Cornwall (1966). He had previously been named a bard of the Gorsedh Kernow in 1952.

Gundry was educated at Rokeby and Mill Hill School, where he was scholar. Following this, Gundry studied classics and philosophy at Balliol College, Oxford, law at Middle Temple, and worked for a few years as a barrister before pursuing music studies at the Royal College of Music in 1935 where he was a pupil of Gordon Jacob (orchestration), R. O. Morris (counterpoint), and Ralph Vaughan Williams (composition). He achieved his first success as a composer in 1936 when his String Quartet was awarded the Cobbett Prize. His first of several novels, The Countess' Penny, was published in 1934.

In 1938 Gundry wrote his first opera Naaman, The Leprosy of War which remains unperformed. He went on to write 12 more operas, including The Logan Rock which premiered at the Minack Theatre on the cliffs at Porthcurno in 1956 with mezzo Edith Coates and conductor Marcus Dods. His eighth opera The Prince of Coxcombs won Morley College's opera composition contest in 1960. His final opera, Galileo, was written in 1996. Gundry became friendly with another Cornish composer of operas, William Lewarne Harris.

Later that year his orchestral suite Heyday Freedom from his opera Return of Odysseus was featured in a performance at The Proms. After the war, he worked as music advisor to the Admiralty's education department and edited The Naval Songbook. His London address during the 1950s was 11, Winterstoke Gardens, N.W.7.

During the second half of his life, Gundry became a committed Christian with what he described as "growing conviction". This interest informed some of his activities as both a writer and musician. In 1960 he co-founded the Sacred Music Drama Society in London with whom he conducted concerts of medieval dramas at Easter and Christmas into the 1980s. His last book, Composers by the Grace of God (1998), examined the role that Christianity played in the lives of many of Western music's greatest composers.

Gundry died in London at the age of 94 and is buried at St. Paul's Church, Mill Hill.

References

1905 births
2000 deaths
English classical composers
English musicologists
English opera composers
Male opera composers
English male classical composers
People from Wimbledon, London
Musicians from London
People educated at Mill Hill School
Alumni of Balliol College, Oxford
Alumni of the Royal College of Music
Royal Navy personnel of World War II
Academics of the University of Cambridge
Academics of the University of London
Academics of the University of Surrey
20th-century English novelists
20th-century classical composers
Pupils of Ralph Vaughan Williams
20th-century English musicians
20th-century British musicologists
Bards of Gorsedh Kernow
20th-century British male musicians